The City of Maribyrnong  is a local government area within the metropolitan area of Melbourne, Australia. It comprises the inner western suburbs between 5 and 10 kilometres from Melbourne city centre. It was formed in 1994 from the merger of the City of Footscray and parts of the City of Sunshine. In June 2018, Maribyrnong had a population of 91,387.

According to Local Government Victoria, Maribyrnong has the second most ethnically diverse population in Victoria, with 40% of residents born outside Australia.

Many of Maribyrnong's former industrial sites have been replaced by residential developments. New residents are generally more educated and higher income. Maribyrnong attracted new cultural groups. Its name comes from the nearby Maribyrnong River.

Wards and councillors

Community snapshot

Figures below are drawn from the 2011 Census unless otherwise stated.

Population and Cultural Diversity 

 The Estimated Residential Population at 30 June 2012 was 76,703
 323 people (0.5%) identified as Aboriginal or Torres Strait Islander.
 40% of the population were born overseas and 43% speak a language other than English.
 The largest non-English language groups include Vietnamese, Cantonese, Mandarin, Greek, Italian and Spanish.
 9.9% of the population do not speak English well or at all.

Social and Economic Disadvantage 

 Braybrook and the City of Maribyrnong are the 4th most disadvantaged suburb and municipality respectively, in the metropolitan area on the SEIFA index of disadvantage.
 The unemployment rate is relatively high. As of the September 2012 quarter, the unemployment rate was 7.9% for the City compared to the Melbourne average of 5.5%, and the national average of 5.2%.
 Unemployment is highest in Braybrook which has an unemployment rate of 15%

Households and Housing 

 Average size is 2.4 people.
 Average weekly income is $1,258.
 25% are couples with children.
 26% are couples without children.
 25% consist of a single individual.
 70.6% have an internet connection.
 35.5% occupy rental housing (both public and private).
 Median weekly rent was 
$380 (versus $300 for Greater Melbourne).
 The median housing payment was $2,167 (versus $1,810 for Greater Melbourne).

Health and Wellbeing 

 The top three chronic, preventable, lifestyle diseases for females are heart disease, type 2 diabetes and depression
 The top three for males are heart disease, lung cancer and stroke.
 Females experience the poorest health in the sub-region with a disease burden rate of 134.9 disability adjusted life years per 1,000.
 Males have the lowest life expectancy in Victoria at 74.8 years.
 Approximately 1 in 5 people have a disability.
 7.1% have experienced food insecurity (not having access to enough food for an active and healthy life)

Emerging cultural groups

Between 2003 and 2008, the city welcomed 4,769 new arrivals. The majority were skilled economic migrants (46%), followed by family migration (33%), and humanitarian entrants (21%).

Key statistics:
 A large proportion of arrivals under humanitarian migration arrived with low to poor English language skills.
 The majority of new arrivals were in the 20–29 year age bracket, with the majority male.
 A large percentage of arrivals are from India, China, Bangladesh and Pakistan and are settling through the skilled migration stream.
 Over 90% of new arrivals from Burma and Sudan are humanitarian migrants.
 Family migration is significant from Vietnam and the United Kingdom.

Business

Approximately 5,392 businesses employ in excess of 35,000 people, although the resident workforce is only around 28,246. Manufacturing was the largest employer of residents with 3,451 employees, followed by retail with 2,668, health care 2,576; scientific and technical services 2,185 and education with 2,145. Key employers include Victoria University, Western Health, Lonely Planet, Highpoint Shopping Centre, Western Bulldogs, Mobil Australia and Sugar Australia (CSR).

On average, 34% of the labour force has university qualifications. In some neighborhoods the proportion reaches 53%. The highest concentration of university qualified residents is in the Footscray/Seddon/Yarraville corridor.

Education

Tertiary
Victoria University has two principal campuses located in Footscray with a student population of around 15,000 and staff of almost 1,200. This represents the largest concentration of tertiary activity in Melbourne's West. Victoria University is Maribyrnong City Council's largest employer, second only to Western Health.

Secondary
Five secondary schools employ approximately 530 staff and enroll more than 4,000 students. Maribyrnong Secondary College became Victoria's first public elite sports school.

Libraries
The Council library service has five branches: Footscray, Maribyrnong at Highpoint Shopping Centre, West Footscray, Yarraville and Braybrook (opened in March 2015). Reflecting the multiculturalism of the community, the library service has a large amount of non-English material. A new branch library at the Bradmill Precinct is planned to replace Yarraville Library.

Townships and localities
The 2021 census, the city had a population of 85,209 up from 82,288 in the 2016 census

^ - Territory divided with another LGA

See also
 List of places on the Victorian Heritage Register in the City of Maribyrnong

References

External links
 
Maribyrnong City Council
Community Profile for the City of Maribyrnong
Public Transport Victoria local public transport map
Link to Land Victoria interactive maps

Local government areas of Melbourne
Greater Melbourne (region)